Aisling Utri (born 21 March 1998) is an Australian rules footballer playing for the Western Bulldogs in the AFL Women's (AFLW). Utri was recruited by the Western Bulldogs as a rookie signing in August 2017 due to her career in field hockey. She made her debut in the twenty-six point win against  at VU Whitten Oval in the opening round of the 2018 season.

References

External links 

1998 births
Living people
Western Bulldogs (AFLW) players
Australian rules footballers from Victoria (Australia)